In mathematics, the Poincaré separation theorem, also known as the Cauchy interlacing theorem, gives some upper and lower bounds of eigenvalues of a real symmetric matrix B'AB that can be considered as the orthogonal projection of a larger real symmetric matrix A onto a linear subspace spanned by the columns of B.  The theorem is named after Henri Poincaré. 

More specifically, let A be an n × n real symmetric matrix and B an n × r semi-orthogonal matrix such that B'B = Ir. We have

Proof 

An algebraic proof, based on the variational interpretation of eigenvalues, has been published in Magnus' Matrix Differential Calculus with Applications in Statistics and Econometrics.   From the geometric point of view, B'AB can be considered as the orthogonal projection of A onto the linear subspace spanned by B, so the above results follow immediately.

References 

Inequalities
Matrix theory